Elections were held in Illinois on Tuesday, November 3, 1936.

Primaries were held April 14, 1936.

The elections overall saw a strong performance by the Democratic Party.

Democrats retained their control of both chambers of the Illinois General Assembly and all statewide executive offices, winning all the statewide executive offices by broad margins. Democrats swept the election for University of Illinois trustees. Democrats also carried the state in the presidential election. Democratic United States senator J. Hamilton Lewis was reelected. Democrats retained all 21 U.S. congressional seats they held in the state, while Republicans retained all 6 seats they held.

Election information

Turnout
In the primaries, 2,674,613 ballots were cast (1,597,418 Democratic and 1,077,195 Republican).

In the general election, 3,995,088 ballots were cast.

Federal elections

United States President 

Illinois voted for the Democratic ticket of Franklin D. Roosevelt and John Nance Garner.

United States Senate 

Democrat J. Hamilton Lewis won reelection to a second consecutive, and third overall, term in the United States Senate.

United States House 

All 27 Illinois seats in the United States House of Representatives were up for election in 1936.

No seats switched parties. The partisan makeup of the state's United States House of Representatives delegation remained 21 Democrats and 6 Republicans.

State elections

Governor

Incumbent first-term governor Henry Horner, a Democrat, won reelection.

Democratic primary
The Chicago political machine unsuccessfully ran Chicago Board of Health president  Herman Bundesen against the incumbent Henry Horner in retribution for Horner having vetoed a bill that would have allowed bookies to legally operate, a bill favored by Chicago political bosses such as Edward J. Kelly.

Candidates
Herman Bundesen, Chicago Board of Health president and Chicago health commissioner, former Cook County coroner
Henry Horner, incumbent governor
James Fred Robertson, 1934 U.S. congress candidate and 1935 Chicago mayoral candidate

Results

Republican primary

Candidates
Charles W. Brooks
Oscar E. Carlstrom, former Illinois attorney general
George W. Dowell, Progressive nominee for Illinois's 25th congressional district in 1914
Thomas P. Gunning, Illinois state senator
J. Paul Kuhn
John G. Oglesby, former lieutenant governor of Illinois (publicly withdrew before primary)
Len Small, former governor of Illinois

General election
Challenging both Democratic nominee Henry Horner and Republican nominee Charles W. Brooks, Republican former Chicago mayor William Hale Thompson ran on the Union Progressive Party of Illinois' ballot line. There were also several other minor candidates.

Lieutenant Governor

Incumbent first-term lieutenant governor Thomas Donovan, a Democrat, did not seek reelection. Democrat John Henry Stelle was elected to succeed him.

Democratic primary

Candidates
John Edward Cassidy, attorney
Isaac Epstein
John Henry Stelle, Illinois treasurer
John L. McCormack

Results

Republican primary

Candidates
John V. Clinnin
Harry F. Hamlin
George Hatzenbuhler
James A. McCallum
Theodore D. Smith
A. Lincoln Wisler

Results

General election

Attorney General 

 
Incumbent first-term Attorney General Otto Kerner Sr., a Democrat, was reelected.

Democratic primary

Republican primary
No candidates ran in the Republican primary. The party ultimately nominated Charles W. Hadley, who had been the distant runner-up in the Democratic primary.

General election

Secretary of State 

Incumbent first-term Democratic Secretary of State Edward J. Hughes, a Democrat, was reelected.

Hughes faced Republican former secretary of state William J. Stratton in a rematch of the 1932 race.

Democratic primary

Republican primary

General election

Auditor of Public Accounts 

Incumbent first-term Auditor of Public Accounts Edward J. Barrett, a Democrat, was reelected.

Democratic primary

Republican primary
State senator Arthur J. Bidwill won the Republican nomination, defeating, among others, fellow state senator Earle Benjamin Searcy.

Results

General election

Treasurer 

Incumbent first-term Treasurer John Henry Stelle, a Democrat, did not seek reelection, instead running for lieutenant governor. Democrat John C. Martin was elected to succeed him in office, granting Martin a second nonconsecutive term as Illinois Treasurer.

Democratic primary
Former Illinois Treasurer, John C. Martin, won the Democratic primary.

Republican primary
Former Illinois state senator Clarence F. Buck won the Republican nomination defeating businessman Anton J. Johnson, former U.S. congressman and former Illinois Treasurer Edward E. Miller, among others.

General election

State Senate
Seats of the Illinois Senate were up for election in 1940. Democrats retained control of the chamber.

State House of Representatives
Seats in the Illinois House of Representatives were up for election in 1940. Democrats retained control of the chamber.

Trustees of University of Illinois

An election was held for three of the nine seats for Trustees of University of Illinois to six year terms. Democrats swept all three seats.

All three incumbents whose terms were expiring (second-term Republican George A. Barr, first-term Republican Edward E. Barrett, and first-term Democrat Walter W. Winslow) were not nominated for reelection.

New Democratic members Homer Mat Adams, James Mansfield Cleary, and Louis C. Moschel were elected.

Judicial elections

Supreme Court
One seat on the Illinois Supreme Court had an election on June 1, 1936.

5th district election
Republican Clyde E. Stone was reelected.

Circuit Courts
Several special elections were held November 3, 1936 for the Illinois Circuit Courts.

Robert J. Dunne was defeated John F. Tyrrell (1,157,312 votes to 709,625 votes) in a nonpartisan race to fill the vacancy left on the Circuit Court of Cook County by the resignation of fellow Democrat Francis S. Wilson.

Democratic nominee Grendel F. Bennett defeated Republican nominee V. W. McIntire (50,216 votes to 42,026 votes) to fill the 5th district vacancy left by the resignation of Craig Van Meter.

Democratic nominee Horace H. Baker defeated Republican nominee Lester H. Martin (43,987 votes to 43,877 votes) to fill the 11th district vacancy left by death of Peter Murphy.

Democratic nominee Francis J. Coyle defeated Republican nominee Albert M. Crampton (51,609 votes to 50,163 votes) to fill the 14th district vacancy left by death of J. Paul Califf.

Despite dying before the election, Republican nominee William J. Emerson defeated Democratic nominee James B. Sheean (38,712 votes to 30,184 votes) to fill the 15th district vacancy left by death of Frank T. Sheean.

Local elections
Local elections were held.

References

 
Illinois